Bryomyia is a genus of midges in the family Cecidomyiidae. The six described species are found in the Holarctic and Oriental regions. The genus was first described by Jean-Jacques Kieffer in 1895.

Species
Bryomyia amurensis Mamaev & Økland, 1998
Bryomyia apsectra Edwards, 1938
Bryomyia bergrothi Kieffer, 1895
Bryomyia gibbosa (Felt, 1907)
Bryomyia helmuti Jaschhof, 2008
Bryomyia producta (Felt, 1908)

References

Cecidomyiidae genera

Insects described in 1895
Taxa named by Jean-Jacques Kieffer